Niall Morris may refer to:

 Niall Morris (singer) (born 1975), Irish classical singer and producer
 Niall Morris (rugby union) (born 1988), Irish rugby union footballer